Tournefeuille (Languedocien: Tornafuèlha) is a commune in the Haute-Garonne department in southwestern France.

It is the second-largest suburb of the city of Toulouse, and is adjacent to it on the west side. It is a member of the Toulouse Métropole.

Geography
The Touch flows northeast through the commune and crosses the town.

Population

The inhabitants of the commune are known as Tournefeuillais and Tournefeuillaises.

Twin towns
Tournefeuille is currently twinned with Graus in Spain.

Sport
Tournefeuille's football club is famous for being Manchester City's Gael Clichy's youth team.

See also
Communes of the Haute-Garonne department

References

External links

 Official site

Communes of Haute-Garonne